Levens is a civil parish in the South Lakeland District of Cumbria, England. It contains 21 listed buildings that are recorded in the National Heritage List for England. Of these, one is listed at Grade I, the highest of the three grades, two are at Grade II*, the middle grade, and the others are at Grade II, the lowest grade.  The parish contains the village of Levens and the surrounding countryside.  The major building in the parish is Levens Hall; this and associated structures are listed.  The other listed buildings include houses, farmhouses, farm buildings, a bridge, a church, and a limekiln.


Key

Buildings

References

Citations

Sources

Lists of listed buildings in Cumbria